Hymenocallis portamonetensis is a bulb-forming herb in the family Amaryllidaceae.  It is native to the State of Chiapas in southern Mexico. The epithet refers to the type locale, along the Río Puerta Moneda in Chiapas.

References

portamonetensis
Flora of Chiapas
Plants described in 1978